Gaw is a surname with at least four different origins. First, it may be derived from the Gaelic word  meaning "foreigner" or "stranger". The surnames Gall and Gaul are derived from the same word. In Brittany it became a surname for immigrants from France, in Lincolnshire for Bretons, in Perthshire and Aberdeen for Lowlanders. Second, it may have originated by shortening the name McGaw, which is an Anglicised form of  meaning "son of Adam". Third, it may be an old spelling of the German surname Gau, which originated as a toponymic surname; see Gau (territory). Finally, it may be an Anglicisation of the Southern Min pronunciation of the Chinese surname pronounced Wú in Mandarin; this spelling came into use in Hong Kong by a family of Chinese immigrants from Myanmar. 

The surname is relatively rare. There were 334 people on the island of Great Britain and 174 on the island of Ireland with the surname Gaw as of 2011, according to statistics cited by Patrick Hanks.

People with the surname include:

 Anthony Gaw (1941–1999), Hong Kong businessman, founder of Pioneer Global Group
 Chippy Gaw (1892–1968), American baseball player
 Elizabeth Eleanor D'Arcy Gaw (1868–1944), Canadian-American metalwork artist
 Goodwin Gaw (born ), Hong Kong businessman
 Kenneth Gaw (born 1970), Hong Kong businessman
 S. C. Gaw (1916–1983), Myanmar-born Hong Kong businessman
 Steve Gaw (born 1957), American politician

References 

Chinese-language surnames
Gaelic-language surnames
Multiple Chinese surnames